Amaranthus acanthochiton, the greenstripe, is an annual plant species of the genus Amaranthus in the family Amaranthaceae. It is native to the southwestern United States (Arizona, New Mexico, Texas, and Utah) and northern Mexico (Chihuahua), growing at elevations of 1000–2000 m where it is uncommon.

It is a dioecious plant growing to 10–80 cm tall. The leaves are slender, 2–8 cm long and 2–12 mm broad. The flowers are pale green, produced in dense terminal spikes. The seeds are brown, 1–1.3 mm diameter, contained in a 2–2.5 mm achene.

It is critically endangered in Utah, and endangered in Arizona (though no status has been set).

The seeds and young leaves were used by the Hopi Indians as a food source.  The seeds were cooked as a form of porridge, while the leaves were used as greens.

References
Flora of North America: Amaranthus acanthochiton

acanthochiton
Pseudocereals
Leaf vegetables
Plants used in Native American cuisine
Tropical agriculture
Flora of the Southwestern United States
Flora of the South-Central United States
Flora of Northeastern Mexico
Dioecious plants